Victor Abdou Samb (born 12 November 1985) is a Senegalese footballer who currently plays for French club AC Amiens as an attacking midfielder.

In addition to spells in France with Toulon, Alfortville, Paris, AC Amiens and FC Mantes, Samb has also played in Belgium for R.E. Virton and in Slovakia for FK Senica.

External links
 
 Victor Abdou Samb at foot-national.com
 

1985 births
Living people
Senegalese footballers
Association football forwards
SC Toulon players
R.E. Virton players
FK Senica players
UJA Maccabi Paris Métropole players
AC Amiens players
Paris FC players
FC Mantois 78 players
GOAL FC players
Challenger Pro League players
Slovak Super Liga players
Championnat National players
Championnat National 2 players
Championnat National 3 players